The 2010–11 South Florida Bulls men's basketball team represented the University of South Florida Bulls during the 2010–11 NCAA Division I men's basketball season. This was the 40th season of basketball for USF.  The team was coached by Stan Heath in his fourth year at the school. USF played its home games in the USF Sun Dome and is a member of the Big East Conference.

Off season
During the off-season, there were several important milestones for the USF basketball program. Construction is expected to be completed by the end of spring 2011. In June, Dominique Jones became the highest player ever drafted to the NBA from USF. He was selected in the first round, as the 25th overall pick by the Memphis Grizzlies, and then traded to the Dallas Mavericks. In August, the team represented the United States in Brazil for the 2010 Pan American University Championships. They took home the silver medal, losing in the finals to Brazil, and finishing with a record of 4-1. At Big East Media day in October, the Bulls were selected to finish in 13th place in the Big East Preseason Coaches' Poll.

Roster

* Must sit out due to NCAA transfer rules and will become eligible in Nov. 2011.

Schedule and results

|-
!colspan=9 style=| Exhibition

|-
!colspan=9 style=| Regular Season

|-
!colspan=9 style=| Big East tournament

References

South Florida Bulls men's basketball seasons
South Florida Bulls